Ueno (written: 上野 or 植野) is a Japanese surname. Notable people with the surname include:

Chizuko Ueno (born 1948), Japanese sociologist
Emiko Ueno (born 1957), retired Japanese female badminton player
Hideaki Ueno (born 1981), Japanese football player
Hidesaburō Ueno (1871–1925), Japanese agricultural scientist
Hikoma Ueno (1838–1904), pioneer Japanese photographer
 Hirokazu Ueno, professional shogi player
Hiroki Ueno (born 1986), Japanese professional baseball pitcher
Hiroki Ueno (born 1986), Japanese professional ice hockey winger
Juri Ueno (born 1986), Japanese actress
Kagenori Ueno (1845–1888), Japanese Consul in Great Britain from 1874 to 1879
Ken Ueno (born 1970), American composer
Kenichiro Ueno (born 1965), Japanese politician
Kōji Ueno (born 1960), Japanese composer and musician
Kyuhei Ueno, Japanese mixed martial artist
Masae Ueno (born 1979), Japanese female judoka
Nobuhiro Ueno (born 1965), Japanese football coach and former player
, Japanese freestyle skier
Rie Ueno (born 1976), Japanese long-distance runner
Shingo Ueno (born 1973), Japanese ski jumper
, Japanese newspaper publisher and philanthropist
Tadami Ueno (born 1948), Japanese professional golfer
Takahiro Ueno (born 1971), Japanese professional drifting driver and businessman
Taro Ueno (born 1980), Japanese sailor
Toshiya Ueno (1963–2013), Japanese film director, actor, screenwriter, and producer
Yoichi Ueno (1883–1957), Japanese business theorist
Yoko Ueno (born 1963), Japanese recording artist
Yoshie Ueno (born 1983), Japanese female judoka
Yoshiharu Ueno (born 1973), Japanese footballer
Yuichiro Ueno (born 1985), Japanese long-distance runner
Yukiko Ueno (born 1982), Japanese softball pitcher
Yusaku Ueno (born 1973), former Japanese football player

Fictional characters 
Naoka Ueno, a character from A Silent Voice (manga)
Susumu Ueno, a teen idol character from A One-Way Ticket to Love (movie)

Japanese-language surnames